Gemur Monastery  is a Buddhist gompa, above the village of Gemur, Lahaul and Spiti district, Himachal Pradesh, northern India.  The monastery dates from the first half of the 17th century.

Geography
A rural road off NH-505 between Keylong and Gemur, terminates at the Gompa.

History

The Gemur Gompa (monastery) is regarded as a central seat of Tibetan Buddhism in the sTod valley of Lahaul.  In religious literature it is also known as Dge-smon Gsam-bstan chos-gling.  It is said to be founded by sTagtshang Raspa in the first half of the 17th century.  As per the legends and folklore Lama Tanzin Paldan of Gemur village was responsible for its construction with the aid of the Thakurs of Khangsar.  Scholars have argued that the Gemur gompa was located at a higher altitude and the present structure was relocated to the lower hill in 1870.  The wood work of the temple is credited to Tashi Tamphel.  The lamas of Gemur belong to the Drukpa Kagyu sect.  Lamas were sent from this monastery to the Gompas of Dartse, Chhukutsi, Zong, Khangsar and Photang in Jispa.

It is reported that a Thanka of a Dam-can Jagpa Me-Len was stolen from the monastery along with other valuable articles in the 1960s.  This is a Tibetan Buddhist painting made on silk cloth and prepared by sewing patches of silk by hand.  This used to be displayed during the Tshechu festival every year held in the monastery when the cham dance was performed.

Architecture and fittings

The Gompa contains a sculpture of the goddess 'Marichi Vajravarahi'.  The monastery also contains ancient Buddhist miniature paintings, wall paintings, chortens, statues and Buddhist artifacts.

Features
The Tshechu Fair is a religious festival celebrated all over the Buddhist Himalayas.  This fair is celebrated on different dates at different places.  At the Shashur, Gemur, Kyi, Kardang, Tabo  and  Mane Monasteries it is held in the month of June.  The cham, a lively masked and costumed dance, is performed during this festival.

Gallery

References

Buddhist monasteries in Himachal Pradesh
Tibetan Buddhist monasteries
Buildings and structures in Lahaul and Spiti district